The Bowie Bandstand is a listed building in Croydon Road Recreation Ground, a public park in Beckenham in the London Borough of Bromley.

The bandstand was erected in 1905, designed by the McCallum and Hope Iron Foundry, Glasgow. It is believed to be the only surviving  McCallum and Hope bandstand in the UK.

On 16 August 1969, David Bowie helped organise, compere and perform at a free festival based at the bandstand. The one-day festival has taken place annually since then, and is now known as Bowie's Beckenham Oddity.

References

David Bowie
Parks and open spaces in the London Borough of Bromley
Grade II listed buildings in the London Borough of Bromley